Yana Vadimyvna Zinkevych (born 2 July 1995 in Rivne) is a paraplegic Ukrainian member of parliament and a military veteran. She was chosen as one of the BBC's 100 Women in 2022.

Life 
Zinkevych was born in 1995 in Rivne.

During the Donbass War, Zinkevych was the commander of the Hospitallers Medical Battalion, having reportedly saved approximately 200 soldiers. She was seriously injured in a car accident in December 2015, and as a result she was left paralysed and she therefore uses a wheelchair. She is one of the recipients of the Ukrainian Order of Merit. In 2022 she was listed as one of BBC's 100 Women.

Zinkevych was chosen as an European Solidarity party's representative (in the 9th convocation of the Verhovna Rada) at the 2019 Ukrainian parliamentary election. She was placed 7th on the party's election list.

References

External links

Ninth convocation members of the Verkhovna Rada
1995 births
Politicians from Rivne
Living people
21st-century Ukrainian women politicians
Ukrainian politicians with disabilities
Women members of the Verkhovna Rada
BBC 100 Women